Maerua acuminata is a species of plant in the Capparaceae family. It is found in Mozambique and Tanzania.

References

acuminata
Data deficient plants
Taxonomy articles created by Polbot
Taxa named by Daniel Oliver